Øvre Byrte is a small village in Tokke Municipality in Vestfold og Telemark county, Norway. The village is located at the end of the Byrtedalen valley where the river Byrteåi flows into the lake Byrtevatn.

References

Tokke
Villages in Vestfold og Telemark